Silver telluride (Ag2Te) is a chemical compound, a telluride of silver, also known as disilver telluride or silver(I) telluride. It forms a monoclinic crystal. In a wider sense, silver telluride can be used to denote AgTe (silver(II) telluride, a metastable compound) or Ag5Te3.

Silver(I) telluride occurs naturally as the mineral hessite, whereas silver(II) telluride  is known as empressite.

Silver telluride is a semiconductor which can be doped both n-type and p-type. Stoichiometric Ag2Te has n-type conductivity. On heating silver is lost from the material.

Non-stoichiometric silver telluride has shown extraordinary magnetoresistance.

References

See also
 Hessite
 Empressite
 Sylvanite

Related materials
 Silver selenide
 Silver sulfide

Silver compounds
Tellurides
Semiconductor materials
Non-stoichiometric compounds